Larazotide (INN; also known as AT-1001; formulated as the salt with acetic acid, larazotide acetate) is a synthetic eight amino acid peptide that functions as a tight junction regulator and reverses leaky junctions to their normally closed state. It is being studied in people with celiac disease.

Structure 
Larazotide is an octapeptide whose structure is derived from a protein (zonula occludens toxin) secreted by Vibrio cholerae.  It has the amino acid sequence GGVLVQPG, IUPAC condensed descriptor of H-Gly-Gly-Val-Leu-Val-Gln-Pro-Gly-OH, and the systematic name glycylglycyl-L-valyl-L-leucyl-L-valyl-L-glutaminyl-L-prolyl-glycine.

Mechanism of action 

Larazotide is an inhibitor of paracellular permeability.  In celiac disease, one pathway that allows fragments of gliadin protein to get past the intestinal epithelium and subsequently trigger an immune response begins with binding of indigestible gliadin fragments to the chemokine CXC motif receptor 3 (CXCR3) on the luminal side of the intestinal epithelium (see this page). This leads to the induction of myeloid differentiation factor 88 (MYD88) and the release of zonulin into the lumen. Zonulin then binds to epidermal growth factor receptor (EGFR) and protease-activated receptor 2 (PAR2) in the intestinal epithelium. This complex then initiates a signalling pathway that eventually results in tight junction disassembly and increased intestinal permeability. Larazotide acetate intervenes in the middle of this pathway by blocking zonulin receptors, thereby preventing tight junction disassembly and associated increase in intestinal permeability.

Origin 
Larazotide acetate is a synthetic peptide based on a Vibrio cholerae enterotoxin called zonula occludens toxin that decreases intestinal permeability. An investigation was carried out to discover which specific part of this toxin was responsible for this activity. Several mutants were constructed and tested for their biological activity and their ability to bind to intestinal epithelial cells in culture. The responsible region was located near the carboxyl terminus of the toxin protein. This region coincided with a peptide product generated by Vibrio cholerae. The eight amino acid sequence in this region was shared with zonulin, an endogenous protein involved in tight junction modulation. This sequence was later designated larazotide acetate.

Research 
It's been used in experiments related to arthritis.

References 

Experimental drugs
Drugs acting on the gastrointestinal system and metabolism
Peptides